Polish composer Witold Lutosławski wrote his Symphony No. 4 in 1988–92, completing it on 22 August 1992.

Structure
The symphony, lasting 20–25 minutes, is in one continuous movement embodying two sections: a preparatory section and a development section with an epilogue.

Analysis
See Stucky.

Orchestration
3 flutes (3rd flute also taking piccolo), 3 oboes (3rd oboe also taking English horn), 3 clarinets (2nd also taking E clarinet; 3rd clarinet also taking bass clarinet), 3 bassoons (3rd also on contrabassoon), 4 horns, 3 trumpets, 3 trombones, tuba, timpani, percussion (bass drum, bongos, chimes, glockenspiel, marimba, snare drum, suspended cymbals, tam-tam, tenor drum, tom-toms, vibraphone, xylophone), 2 harps, piano, celesta, and strings.

World Premiere
The symphony received its world premiere on February 5, 1993 from the Los Angeles Philharmonic, with the composer conducting, at the Dorothy Chandler Pavilion in Los Angeles, California.  It was commissioned by the Los Angeles Philharmonic with the support of Betty Freeman.

Recordings

References
Notes

Sources

4
Lutoslawski 4
Lutoslawski Symphony 4
Music commissioned by the Los Angeles Philharmonic